CHUG is a community radio station that operates at 740 AM in Stephenville, Newfoundland and Labrador, Canada.

Owned by Troubador Radio Society Inc. the station was licensed by the Canadian Radio-television and Telecommunications Commission (CRTC) in 1990.

References

External links
Troubador Online
CHUG-AM history - Canadian Communication Foundation

Hug
Hug